A Cowboy's Song is the fourteenth album released by the Sons of the San Joaquin.

Track listing

Personnel

Sons of the San Joaquin

Jack Hannah
Joe Hannah
Lon Hannah

Additional personnel

Rich O'Brien – Guitar, Banjo, Mandolin, Marimba
Marc Abbott – Bass
Richard Chon, Reggie Rueffer, Steve Story, Brook Wallace – Fiddles, Strings
Ginny Mac, Tim Alexander – Accordion, Marimba, Harmonica
Brandon Fulton – Harmonica
Johnny Cox – Steel Guitar
Russ Rand – Bass
Phil Babcock – Drums, Percussion
Jon Stutler – Clarinet

Production

Recorded at:
Maximus Media, Fresno, CA
Rodger Glaspey – Executive Producer
Rich O'Brien – Producer
Russ Pate – Assistant Producer
Eric Sherbon – Engineer, Vocal Mix
Allegro Sound, Burleson, TX
Aarom Medor – Engineer, Mix, Mastering
Western Jubilee Warehouse, Colorado Springs, CO (title track)
Butch Hause – Engineer
David Martin Graham, Donald Kallaus – Photography
Donald Kallaus, Kathleen F. Collins, Debra Lake – Layout, Design
Scott O'Malley & Associates, LLC – artist representation

External links
Official site

References

References

2011 albums
Sons of the San Joaquin albums